Priit Võigemast (born 18 April 1980) is an Estonian film, television and stage actor. Between 2002 and 2007 he has performed in the Ugala, Tallinna Linnateater and other theatres. He is probably best known for the role of Henn Ahas in the 2002 war drama Names in Marble. He was married to actress Evelin Võigemast.

Biography

Theatre performances 
 2002: "Niskamäe kired" – Antti
 2003: "Ullike ootamatuste saarelt" – Ingel
 2003: "Minu pere ja muud loomad" – Gerald Durrell
 2003: "Kevade" – Lesta
 2003: "Koturnijad ehk Kui nalja ei saa, siis meie ei mängi" – Mees, Peremees, Põis
 2003: "Toomas Nipernaadi" – Toomas Nipernaadi
 2003: "Thijl Ulenspiegel" – kuningas Felipe, vaim
 2004: "80 päevaga ümber maailma" – salapolitseinik Fax
 2004: "Aarete saar" (Treasure Island) – Jim Hawkins
 2005: "Suvi" – Tõnisson
 2005: "Lõõmav pimedus" – Carlos
 2005: "Anna Karenina" – krahv Aleksei Kirillovitsh Vronski
 2006: "Saateviga" – Dönci
 2006: "Kolm klaasikest kirsiviina" – erinevad rollid
 2006: "Marilyn" – Joe DiMaggio
 2007: "Opera Comique" - Georges Bizet
 1999: "Hamlet" – Laertes (Linnateater)
 1999: "Kolmekrossiooper" – Filch (Linnateater)
 2001: "Musketärid kakskümmend aastat hiljem" – Vikont de Bragelonne (Linnateater)
 2003: "Bent" – Rudy (Vanalinnastuudio)
 2004: "Grease" – Danny Zuko (Nukuteater)
 2004: "Latern" – Sass projektiteater

Tallinna Linnateater performances 
 2007: C. Gozzi "Ronk" - Smeraldina, Brighella, Ratsu
 2007: "Karin. Indrek. Tõde ja õigus. 4." - Melesk

Television roles
 Kelgukoerad - Pulk (2010)
 Õnne 13 - Marko Reikvere (2005-2010)
 Buratino tegutseb jälle - Buratino (2003)
 Restart - Marek (2015)
 Pank - Kalju Tamm (2018)
 Alo - Viljo (2018)

Filmography
 Täna öösel me ei maga (English release title: Set Point) - Kristofer (2004) 
 Nimed marmortahvlil (English: Names in Marble) - Henn Ahas (2002)
 Lotte and the Moonstone Secret - Paul the Cat (2011)
 Vasaku jala reede - Lihunik (2012)
 Väikelinna detektiivid ja Valge Daami saladus - Stig Velson (2013)
 Elavad pildid - Julius (2013)
 Teesklejad - Juhan (2016)
 Luuraja ja luuletaja (2016)
 Võta või jäta - Lawyer (2018)
 Eia jõulud Tondikakul - Oskar (2018)
 Tõde ja õigus (English: Truth and Justice) - Pearu (2019)
 O2 - Feliks Kangur (2020)
 Kalev - Riho Soonik (2022)

References

External links
 

1980 births
Living people
People from Rapla Parish
Estonian male television actors
Estonian male film actors
Estonian male stage actors
20th-century Estonian male actors
21st-century Estonian male actors
Estonian Academy of Music and Theatre alumni